Zebunisa Bangash (born 7 March 1982), better known as Zeb Bangash, is a Pakistani singer-songwriter from Lahore, Punjab. Her family originally comes from Khyber Pakhtunkhwa. Apart from her solo career, she was the member of music group Zeb and Haniya along with Haniya Aslam who is her first cousin.

She has been active since 2008 and is the first Pakistani artist who served as a music director of Bollywood movie Lipstick Under My Burkha, which received 18 film awards. During her career, Bangash has recorded songs in Urdu, Pashto, Punjabi, Turkish, Persian, Saraiki and others. She has been often seen on the Pakistani television shows Coke Studio and Pepsi Battle of the Bands.

Career
Zebunisa Bangash began her career with her cousin Haniya Aslam as Zeb and Haniya. They released their debut album Chup! in 2008. In 2013, Zeb did a song for the film Madras Cafe and made her debut in Bollywood. She continued her solo career after Haniya left for studies in Canada. She sung for the soundtrack of Highway (2014), Bin Roye (2015), Manto (2015), Ho Mann Jahan (2016), Fitoor (2016), Lala Begum (2016), Verna (2017), Parwaaz Hai Junoon (2018), Baaji (2019), Parey Hut Love (2019) and Superstar (2019). She also sung the title track of television series Diyar-e-Dil which won Lux Style Award for Best Original Soundtrack and Hum Award for Best Original Soundtrack in 2016.

She has sung several songs for Coke Studio., including Paimona, Chup, Chal Diyay, Bibi Sanam Janem, Tann Dolay and more. She then also performed a single in the second season Pepsi Battle of the Bands. In 2019, she performed "Roshe", a Kashmiri ode to loss in CokeStudio12.

Zeb Bangash is the first Pakistani artist to serve as music director of an award-winning Bollywood film; 
 
She is part of the Brooklyn-based ensemble Sandaraa, with the klezmer clarinetist/composer Michael Winograd and a number of other leading Brooklyn-based musicians.

Personal life
She married on 5 November 2017.

Discography

Soundtracks

Singles

Awards and nominations

|-
! style="background:#bfd7ff" colspan="4"|Lux Style Awards
|-
|rowspan="2"|2016
|"Kya Hoga" – Manto
|Best Female Playback
|
|-
|"Yar-e-Mann" – Diyar-e-Dil
|Best OST
|
|-
! style="background:#bfd7ff" colspan="4"|Hum Awards
|-
|2016
|"Yar-e-Mann" – Diyar-e-Dil
|Hum Award for Best Original Soundtrack
|
|}

References

External links

Living people
Pashtun people
Pakistani women singer-songwriters
Musicians from Khyber Pakhtunkhwa
1981 births
People from Kohat District
21st-century Pakistani women singers